Kim Ha-jong(김하종, 金夏鐘), 1793–after 1875, was a Joseon court painter. His ho  was Yudang, 유당, 蕤堂. He is known for the Album of Sea and Mountains (Haesan-docheop, 해산도첩,海山圖帖),  which contains 25 paintings, each of them is 29.7×43.3cm. This work was painted in 1815, at the request of Yi Gwangmun (1778–1838), who wrote the colophon of the Album.

Contents of the Haesando Album
Remark: the hanja given here are an exact reproduction of the title written on each painting

Paintings 1-2-3-4-25 are about Mount Seorak while paintings 5--24 are about Mount Geumgang

01-Naksan Temple, 낙산사, 洛山寺 (38.1246,128.6283, near Sokcho)
02-Gyejo Grotto, 계조굴, 繼祖窟
03-Seorakssang Falls, 설악쌍폭, 雪嶽雙瀑
04-Seorak Gyeongcheon Wall, 설악경천벽, 雪嶽擎天壁
 ---
05-Jangan Temple seen from Cheonildae Rocks, 장안사, 長安寺
06-Myeonggyeong Rocks, 명경대, 明鏡臺
07-Dabo Peak, 다보탑, 多寶塔
08-Yeongwon Valley, 영원동, 靈源洞
09-Jeongyang Temple below Cheonildae Rocks, 천일대망정양사, 天一臺望正陽寺
10-Frontal View of Mount Geumgang from Hyeolseongru Pavilion (at Jeongyangsa), 헐성루망전면전경, 歇性樓望前面全景
11-Sumi Peaks, 수미탑, 須彌塔
12-Gugu Hermitage, 구구동, 九九洞
13-Bunseol Pond, 분설담, 噴雪潭
14-Bodeok Hermitage,  보덕암, 普德菴
15-Jinju Pearl Pond, 진주담, 眞珠潭 
16-Gaseop Valley, 가섭동, 迦葉洞
17-Mahayon Hermitage, 마하연, 摩訶衍
18-Twelve Falls seen from Eunseondae Rocks, 은선대망십이폭, 隱仙臺望十二暴
19-Flying Phoenix Falls, 비봉폭, 飛鳳暴
20-Nine Dragons Falls, 구룡폭, 九龍瀑
21-Chongseok Rocks,  叢石, 총석정   
22-Chongseok Rock seen from Hwansonjong Site, 환선구지망총석, 喚仙舊址望叢石
23-Samil Lake, 삼일호, 三日湖
24-Coastal Geumgang, 해금강, 海金剛
 ---
25-Seorak's view, 설악전경, 雪嶽全景

References
MET https://www.metmuseum.org/art/collection/search/748823

National Museum of Korea https://www.museum.go.kr/site/eng/relic/search/view?relicId=6280

See also
https://blog.daum.net/gofor99/429 = 05
https://blog.daum.net/gofor99/431 = 06+07+08+09+10+11
https://blog.daum.net/gofor99/432 = 12+13+14+15+16+17
https://blog.daum.net/gofor99/433 = 18+19+20+21+22+23+24
https://blog.daum.net/gofor99/434 = 01+02+03+25+04

19th-century Korean painters
1793 births
Year of death unknown